is a Japanese professional golfer.

Higaki plays on the Japan Golf Tour, where he has won once.

Professional wins (2)

Japan Golf Tour wins (1)

Japan Challenge Tour wins (1)
1997 Daiwa Cup Kochi Open

Playoff record
Asian Tour playoff record (0–1)

External links

Japanese male golfers
Japan Golf Tour golfers
Sportspeople from Osaka Prefecture
1976 births
Living people